Pig shows are an event  where pigs are evaluated for their quality. They are evaluated on a multitude of things which include composition (muscle vs. fat), capaciousness, and skeletal integrity along with general appearance and conformation to their respective breed. Owners buy or raise their pigs from small piglets and spend time learning what the pig needs to make it the best possible.  You can switch up compositions of a pig by simply changing what and how you feed them. Other names for a pig show include swine show and hog show. A pig show is frequently part of a larger agricultural show.  During the agricultural show pigs may be shown, as well as cattle, goats, and sheep.

History
Pig shows began on farms where the owner and other pig farmers would gather to decide which pig had the best qualities for breeding. These would not be named pig shows, but ultimately they were making a decision on which animals to retain to breed. Eventually, breeders would meet at a specified location and bring an outside person to evaluate their pigs, and to order them in a ranking. These were the first shows.

A show is typically divided up into classes so that the judge can study fewer pigs at a time. Typically these classes are broken down to the breed of pig, weight, or age. There are division or breed champions and reserve champions. Then ultimately, an overall grand champion will be chosen.

Swine judging
Swine judging is the process of selectively ordering swine or domestic pigs in order to determine the best pig. For market hogs, traits are ranked in order of their importance: Degree of muscling, growth, capacity or volume, degree of leanness, structure and soundness.
For breeding gilts, the traits by order of importance are: Structure and soundness, Growth, Underline quality, Capacity or volume, Degree of muscling, Degree of leanness. 

A judge will have different priorities and rank importance of certain traits differently than other judges. Judges are selected because they are typically influential breeders within the show pig industry.

Pig shows by country

Major pig shows in the United States

Show pig breeds in the United States

Pig shows in People's Republic of China 
In China, the first pig show was the Guangdong Breeding Pigs Auction which began January 18, 1996. Most pig shows in china are pig-breeding auctions. More than 10 provinces have in the past hosted these pig-breeding auctions, but only two provinces (Guangdong Province and Hubei Province) still host it.

Pig show in Australia
In Australia, The Sydney Royal Easter Show Competition is held annually.
The Sydney Royal Easter Show is one of the largest and most prestigious pig shows in Australia. It is held in Sydney, at the Paddington Pavilion. Pigs were exhibited at the first Sydney Royal Easter Show in 1858 and the pig competition has been held at nearly every show since. Exhibitors that compete at the Sydney Royal Pig Show are often from small family-based Stud farms.

Pig breeds exhibited include:
Berkshire (pig), 
Duroc (pig), 
Hampshire (pig), 
American Landrace,
Large White pig, 
Tamworth pig
Wessex Saddleback pig.

See also
Swine judging

Notes

External links
 National Swine Registry
Swine Genetics Publications
 Purdue Pork Page
 Babcock Genetics Inc.
 Babcock Genetics Inc.
Chinese Pig Show

Pigs
Competitions
Livestock
Animal shows